Leslie Silva (born April 21, 1968) is an American actress who has had long running television roles in Odyssey 5, Providence, and Shades of Blue.

Early life and education
In 1968, Silva was born in Schenectady, New York. She graduated from the University of Connecticut with a BFA in dramatic arts (1989) then attended the Juilliard School (1991–1995) where she earned a MFA in drama.

Career 
Silva began her professional acting career in 1995, in an off-Broadway production of Macbeth in [[Washington, D.C.]she has starred in many series, most recently SO HELP ME TODD sand POKERFACE. 

Silva is an activist.

Filmography

References

External links 
 
 NYWIFT.org

1968 births
Actresses from New York (state)
American expatriate actresses in Canada
Juilliard School alumni
Actors from Schenectady, New York
Living people
University of Connecticut alumni
American television actresses
African-American actresses
American film actresses
American stage actresses
21st-century African-American people
21st-century African-American women
20th-century African-American people
20th-century African-American women